Xoşbulaq (also, Khachbulag, Khachbulak, and Khashbulag) is a village and municipality in the Dashkasan Rayon of Azerbaijan.  It has a population of 1,917.

References 

Populated places in Dashkasan District